Mei-mei Berssenbrugge (born October 5, 1947, in Beijing, China) is a contemporary poet. Winner of two American Book Awards, her work is often associated with the Language School, the poetry of the New York School, phenomenology, and visual art.  She is married to the painter Richard Tuttle, with whom she has frequently collaborated.

Personal life

Berssenbrugge was born in Beijing to Chinese and Dutch-American parents, and grew up near Boston, Massachusetts.  She was educated at Barnard, Reed, and Columbia University. After receiving her M.F.A. from Columbia in 1974, she settled in rural northern New Mexico, which has remained her primary residence ever since.

Poetry

After receiving her degree, Berssenbrugge became active in the multicultural poetry movement of the 1970s along with Leslie Marmon Silko as well as Ishmael Reed, theater director Frank Chin, and political activist Kathleen Chang. Berssenbrugge taught at the Institute of American Indian Art in Santa Fe, where she co-founded the internal literary journal Tyuonyi.

Traveling frequently to New York City, Berssenbrugge became engaged in the rich cultural flourishing of the abstract art movement, and was influenced by New York School poets John Ashbery, Barbara Guest, James Schuyler and Anne Waldman, and then the Language poets, including Charles Bernstein, as well as artist Susan Bee. She later joined the contributing editorial board for the literary journal Conjunctions.

Berssenbrugge's poetry is known for its mix of philosophical meditation and personal experience, and for moving quickly between abstract language and the concrete particulars of immediate perception. Her poems often contain subtle shifts of grammar and perspective, and Berssenbrugge often works with collage to produce unexpected juxtapositions.  Her work is also known for its exploration of the complexities of cultural and political identity, an interest informed by her own experience of cultural and linguistic displacement.

Fish Souls
Fish Souls is Berssenbrugge's first published collection of poems.  It was published by Greenwood Press in 1971.  Only 100 numbered copies were published.  Information about this volume is scarce.

Summits Move with the Tide
Summits Move with the Tide, subtitled (on the cover of the second edition) Poems and a Play, is Berssenbrugge's second collection of poems.  It was published by the Greenfield Review Press in 1974, and later in 1982.  The acknowledgments page indicates that some of the poems previously appeared in First Issue, Intro 3, East-West Journal, Cathedral, Ash Tree, Gidra, and Greenwood Press.  In contrast to her later books, most of the poems in the collection are short, with only a few carrying over to new pages.  Additionally, only two poems are broken into numbered stanzas, a format Berssenbrugge would use in later poems.  The poems in the collection are organized into four groups: three groups of poems, and one play, One, Two Cups.

The book contains the following poems:

Group 1: "Aegean"; "Finn Song to the Bear Ghosts"; "Bog"; "Book of the Dead, Prayer"; "El Bosco"; "Spirit"; "Hopi Basketweaver Song"; "Beetle Is Born, Lives ..."; "Los Sangre de Cristos"; "In Bhaudanath"; "Snow Mountains"; "Red Backs & Autumn Leaves ..."; and "Ghost".

Group 2: "Old Man Let's Go Fishing In ..."; "Travelling [sic] Through Your Country"; "Propeller Sleep"; "Fish & Swimmers & Lonely Birds ..."; "Spaces Are Death"; "The Second Moment"; "The Third Moment"; "Perpetual Motions"; "Leaving Your Country"; "The Old Know by Midsummer"; and "Abortion".

Group 3: "Written Before Easter in New York"; "Chronicle"; "Tracks"; "On the Winter Solstice"; "Blossom"; "Hudson Ice Floes"; "Poor Mouse"; "Sky"; and "March Wind".

Group 4: The play,  One, Two Cups.

Random Possession
Random Possession was published by I. Reed Books in 1982.  On the contents page the poems are separated spatially into five unnumbered groups (with only the first three listed on the contents page).  The pagination bears out the scheme, with one empty page between the groups. The book contains the following poems:

Group 1: "Chronicle".

Group 2: "The Membrane"; "Rabbit, Hair, Leaf"; "On the Mountain with the Deer"; "The Suspension Bridge"; "Numbers of the Date Become the Names of Birds"; "Spring Street Bar"; "Heat Wave"; "The Intention of Two Rivers"; "For The Tails of Comets"; and "Sleep".

Group 3: "The Field for Blue Corn"; "The Reservoir"; "The White Beaver"; "Breaking the Circumference"; "A Deer Listening"; "You and You"; and "Goodbye, Goodbye".

Group 4: "The Scientific Method (for Walter)"; "Walter Calls It a Dream Screen"; "The Constellation Quilt"; "Run-off and Silt"; "The Translation of Verver"; and "Commentary".

Group 5: "Tail".

The Heat Bird
In The Heat Bird, Berssenbrugge shifted to a long-verse format.  The book contains only four poems, all several pages long and broken into numbered stanzas: "Pack Rat Sieve"; "Farolita"; "Ricochet Off Water"; and "The Heat Bird".  The verso indicates that some of the poems in the book were previously published in Conjunctions, Contact II, Roof, and Telephone.

Empathy 
Empathy was published by Station Hill Press in 1989, and contains three numbered groups of poems.  The verso indicates that some of the poems appeared in Bridge, Calaban, Conjunctions, Parnassus, Temblor, and Tyuonyi.  The book is dedicated to Bradford Morrow and Sheffield Van Buren, and contains the following poems:

Group 1: "The Blue Taj"; "Tan Tien"; "Alakanak Break-Up"; "Texas"; "Duration of Water"; "The Star Field"; and "Chinese Space".

Group 2: "Jealousy"; "Recitative"; "The Carmelites"; "The Margin"; "Naturalism"; and "Fog".

Group 3: "War Insurance"; "Empathy"; "The Swan"; "Forms of Politeness"; and "Honeymoon".

Sphericity 
Sphericity was published by Kelsey Street Press in 1993, and was her second collaboration with Richard Tuttle.  The first edition of Sphericity was limited to 2000 copies, with the first 50 signed by Berssenbrugge and Tuttle and hand-colored by Tuttle.  The book consists of six long poems, all with several numbered stanzas:  "Ideal"; "Size"; "Combustion"; "Sphericity"; "Experience"; and "Value".

Endocrinology
Endocrinology is an artists' book poem made in collaboration with visual artist Kiki Smith.  Forty copies were produced by Universal Limited Art Editions from a maquette made by Berssenbrugge and Smith.  The Kelsey Street Press edition, a facsimile of the original book, was limited to 2,000 copies, with the first 60 signed and numbered.

Awards

 1976 National Endowment for the Arts Fellowship.
 1980 American Book Award for Random Possession.
 1981 National Endowment for the Arts Fellowship.
 1984 American Book Award for The Heat Bird.
 1990 National Endowment for the Arts Award.
 1990 PEN West Award for Empathy.
 1998 Asian American Literary Award for Endocrinology.
 1999 Western States Book Award for Four Year Old Girl.
 2004 Asian American Literary Award for Nest.

Work

Poetry
 Fish Souls. New York: Greenwood Press. 1971
  Other .
  Other ;
  Other ISBN I0930901037; 0930901037; 9780930901035
 Hiddenness.  New York : Library Fellows of the Whitney Museum of American Art. 1987 (A collaboration with Richard Tuttle)
 Empathy. Barrytown, NY: Station Hill Press. 1989
 Mizu. Tucson, AZ: Chax Press. 1990
  Other ISBNs: 9780932716309; 0932716318; 9780932716316 (A collaboration with Richard Tuttle)
   Other ISBNs: 0932716423 (Limited Edition) (A collaboration with Kiki Smith)
 Four Year Old Girl. Berkeley, CA: Kelsey Street Press, 1998
 
   (A collaboration with Kiki Smith)
 
 Hello, the Roses. New York: New Directions, 2013. .
 A Treatise on Stars. New York: New Directions, 2020. .

Plays
 One, Two Cups, directed by Frank Chin, and published in 1974 in Summits Move With the Tide.
 Kindness (1994), commissioned by the Ford Foundation and staged at the Center for Contemporary Arts in Santa Fe with the collaboration of Richard Tuttle, Tan Dun, and Chen Shi Zheng.

Chapbooks
 Pack Rat Seive. New York Cambridge Graphic Arts, 1983

Broadsides
 The Mouse 5.  IE Poetry Broadside Series Two, Clayton Fine Books, 2006.  "Issued in an edition of 25 copies of which 20 copies are for sale."

Magazines and journals

 Berssenbrugge, Mei-mei.  The Mouse,  Conjunctions, Number 48, Spring 2007.

Anthologies

References

External links
The Mei-mei Berssenbrugge page at Poets.org
Mei-mei Berssenbrugge's author page at the Electronic Poetry Center
Mei-mei Berssenbrugge page at Penn Sound
A review of  I Love Artists  by Ben Lerner
Mei-mei Berssenbrugge Links at "Intercapillary Space" – links to Berssenbrugge poems, reviews, talks, recordings
Berssenbrugge's works at [http://www.kelseyst.com/ Kelsey Street Press]
"Add-Verse" a poetry-photo-video project Berssenbrugge participated in
 Hinton, Laura. "Three Conversations With Mei-mei Berssenbrugge" Jacket, Issue 27, 2005
Sentimental Spaces:  On Mei-mei Berssenbrugge's "Nest,"  by Natalia Cecire
Boundary Work in Mei-mei Berssenbrugge's "Pollen," by Jonathan Skinner
Mei-mei Berssenbrugge Papers. Yale Collection of American Literature, Beinecke Rare Book and Manuscript Library.

Poems and prose
Audience
Concordance [Our conversation is a wing]
Concordance [Working backwards in sleep
From A Context of a Wave, published in Conjunctions 17, Fall 1991
Duration of Water
Forms of Politeness
Hello, the Roses, published in Bomb issue 117, Fall 2011
Ideal
Kate's Talk, a talk presented by Mei-mei Berssenbrugge at The Poetry Project, St. Mark's on the Bowery, October 1987
The New Boys, published in the October 2008 issue of The Brooklyn Rail
New Form, opening remarks delivered at the "New Forms/New Functions" panel of the Poetry Project's Symposium, Poetry of Everyday Life
Permanent Home
Red Quiet; Section 3
Reservoir
Safety from How 2, Volume 1, Issue 8, 2002
Starfield
Susie, Kiki, Annie, published in Big Bridge
Tan Tien
Texas
Two Lines, Reprinted from "A Broken Thing: Poets on the Line," edited by Emily Rosko and Anton Vander Zee

Audio
A recording of a reading and conversation with Charles Bernstein
A recording of Berssenbrugge reading at the University of California, Berkeley
Berssenbrugge reading her poem, Texas

Video
A video of Berssenbrugge reading at the Lensic Theater in Santa Fe, New Mexico, April 1, 1999
 A video of Berssenbrugge in conversation with Arthur Sze
Lunch Poems: Mei-mei Berssenbrugge
A video of Mei-mei Berssenbrugge Reading from "Plant Fragments"

1947 births
Living people
Chinese emigrants to the United States
Modernist women writers
Columbia University School of the Arts alumni
Reed College alumni
American writers of Chinese descent
American women poets
20th-century American poets
20th-century American women writers
Barnard College alumni
American Book Award winners
American women writers of Chinese descent